Dichomeris themelia is a moth in the family Gelechiidae. It was described by Edward Meyrick in 1913. It is found in São Paulo, Brazil.

The forewings are rather dark purplish fuscous with a pale brownish-ochreous patch occupying the costal half of the wing from the base to three-fourths, indented by a large irregular-trapezoidal blackish blotch from the dorsum before the middle reaching two-thirds across the wing, and an irregular trilobed blackish blotch in the disc at two-thirds. The hindwings are fuscous.

References

Moths described in 1913
themelia